Belvidere Discount Mall is a small shopping mall located on Belvidere Street in Waukegan, Illinois, United States.  It was one of the first shopping malls in the Chicago metropolitan area, and the first enclosed shopping mall in Lake County.  Its current main anchor store is a Home Depot.  The mall is notable for reinventing itself over time to remain open, with a current store mix.

History
Belvidere Mall opened on November 18, 1965 and was Lake County's first enclosed shopping mall. The anchor stores was Montgomery Ward department store that had formerly been in downtown Waukegan.

While the mall thrived at first, the opening of the much larger nearby Lakehurst Mall in 1971 put a serious dent in Belvidere's fortunes.  In 1988, sole anchor Montgomery Ward left for Lakehurst. After about seven years of being empty, Builders Square occupied the anchor spot in 1995, and was replaced with Home Depot around 2000.

A 1,000 seat movie theater opened at the mall in January 1966.  It was originally operated by the General Cinema Corporation as a single-screen, and later twinned before closing in the summer of 1989, with the mall in decline and General Cinema expanding the nearby Lakehurst Cinema. In 1991 it was made a four-screen and reopened as a discount theater. In 2002 the Belvidere Theatres joined the reopened Lakehurst Cinemas as part of the Village Theaters chain, however Village closed the Belvidere operation at the end of 2003.

The mall has been renovated twice, in 1985 and again in 1998.  The mall is currently owned by Imperial Realty, who purchased it from original owners Landuau & Heyman Inc. in the fall of 1985.  As part of the 1998 renovation, the mall was renamed Belvidere Discount Mall.

Today Belvidere Mall differs from Lake County's other shopping malls, Gurnee Mills and Hawthorn Mall because all of the tenants, except for The Home Depot, are family-owned. Nearly all of them are Hispanic-owned or Hispanic-oriented. Since 2019 the mall also embraced artists and creators in Waukegan, lending vacant retail spaces and the former Belvidere Cinema for use as galleries and music venues.

References

External links
Official website
Imperial Realty's Belvidere Mall site

1965 establishments in Illinois
Shopping malls established in 1965
Shopping malls in Lake County, Illinois
Waukegan, Illinois